Ryan David Leak (born 28 February 1998) is a Welsh professional footballer who plays as a defender for EFL League Two club Salford City and former Welsh under-17's international. He has previously had spells at Wolverhampton Wanderers, Burgos and Burton Albion.

Career
Born in Burton Upon Trent, Leak joined Wolverhampton Wanderers academy at the age of 7 staying at the club for 14 years, progressing through the ranks, before making his debut for the U23 side in 2016 in a 3–2 victory over Crewe Alexandra in the EFL Trophy.

He went on to enjoy three loan spells, the first being a short loan to The New Saints in the Cymru Premier, where he made 12 appearances, scoring a solitary goal in a 5–2 victory against Carmarthen Town. After a short unsuccessful loan at AFC Telford United, a third loan spell took him abroad to Spain, where he joined FC Jumilla on a season long loan for the 2018–19 Segunda División B, making 30 appearances.

Leak left Wolves at the end of the 2018–19 season, after 14 years, and joined fellow Segunda División B side Burgos CF, where he played 25 games over the following two seasons.

After leaving Burgos, Leak joined Burton Albion on trial, before signing a two-year deal with the club in July 2021.

On 18 July 2022, Leak joined League Two club Salford City for an undisclosed fee, signing a two-year deal.

Personal life
Ryan is the brother of Kidderminster Harriers defender Tom Leak.

Honours

The New Saints

 Welsh Premier League: 2017–18

References

External links

Living people
1998 births
People from Burton upon Trent
English people of Welsh descent
English footballers
Association football defenders
Wolverhampton Wanderers F.C. players
The New Saints F.C. players
AFC Telford United players
FC Jumilla players
Burgos CF footballers
Burton Albion F.C. players
Salford City F.C. players
Cymru Premier players
National League (English football) players
Segunda División B players
English Football League players
English expatriate footballers
English expatriate sportspeople in Spain
Expatriate footballers in Spain